Nikolayevka is a rural locality (a selo) in Serebropolsky Selsoviet, Tabunsky District, Altai Krai, Russia. The population was 182 as of 2013. There are 2 streets.

Geography 
Nikolayevka is located 38 km northeast of Tabuny (the district's administrative centre) by road. Khorosheye is the nearest rural locality.

References 

Rural localities in Tabunsky District